Paulo Vinícius may refer to:

 Paulo Vinícius (footballer, born 1984), Brazilian footballer
 Paulo Vinícius (footballer, born 1990), Brazilian-born Hungarian footballer